Ayodele Olajide Falase (born 4 January 1944) is a Nigerian cardiologist and academic. He is a former vice chancellor of the University of Ibadan. He served as a WHO Expert committee member on cardiopathies and on a WHO expert panel on cardiovascular disease.

Early life 
Ayodele was born on 4 January 1944 in the village of Erin-Oke, Oriade local government of Osun state, Nigeria.

Ayodele completed his education in the following schools:

 Secondary education at Remo Secondary School, Segamu, Lagos State, Nigeria - 1956
 Igbobi College, Yaba - 1957-62
 University of Ibadan - 1963-68
 Royal College of Physicians, UK - 1971
 National Postgraduate Medical College of Nigeria - 1976
 Royal College of Physicians of London - 1982

Career 
Ayodele started his career at University College Hospital, Ibadan in 1968-69, immediately after graduation from the same university. He became a house physician in 1969-70 and a registrar in 1971-72, in the same college hospital. He held several positions on this career path until he rose to become a professor of cardiology and founder of Pan African Society of Cardiology (PASCAR).
He was awarded the Nigerian National Merit Award in 2005 and currently one of the four Emeritus Professors at the Department of Medicine, University of Ibadan. An Introduction to Clinical Diagnosis in the Tropics, a popular clinical clerkship book among Nigerian clinical medical students was first published by him in 1986.

Research 
Ayodele's publications include subjects on:
 Cardiomyopathy 
 Peripartum heart disease
 Infectious and dilated cardiomyopathy
Hypertension 
 Heart failure
Ischaemic Heart disease  
 Congenital heart diseases

Books 
The human heart fountain of life: inaugural lecture delivered on Tuesday 27 January 1981

An introduction to clinical diagnosis in the tropics(1986)

Cardiovascular disease(1987)

References 

1944 births
Living people
Vice-Chancellors of the University of Ibadan
Nigerian cardiologists
Igbobi College alumni
University of Ibadan alumni
20th-century Nigerian medical doctors